Paul Lacombe may refer to:

 Paul Lacombe (composer) (1837–1927), Languedocien (French) composer and pianist 
 Paul Lacombe (basketball) (born 1990), French basketball player
 Paul Lacombe (historian) (1834–1919), French historian and archivist

See also
 Paul Lacôme (1838–1920), French composer